The 2012 World Karate Championships are the 21st edition of the World Karate Championships, and were held in Paris, France from November 21 to November 25, 2012.

Medalists

Men

Women

Medal table

Participating nations 
990 athletes from 116 nations competed.

 (1)
 (4)
 (16)
 (1)
 (4)
 (5)
 (8)
 (11)
 (9)
 (3)
 (11)
 (9)
 (1)
 (7)
 (12)
 (2)
 (12)
 (11)
 (6)
 (12)
 (10)
 (12)
 (8)
 (14)
 (5)
 (2)
 (23)
 (2)
 (1)
 (2)
 (12)
 (6)
 (7)
 (6)
 (19)
 (19)
 (1)
 (8)
 (24)
 (8)
 (7)
 (22)
 (13)
 (1)
 (9)
 (13)
 (3)
 (9)
 (10)
 (14)
 (6)
 (6)
 (18)
 (21)
 (12)
 (13)
 (8)
 (6)
 (1)
 (4)
 (5)
 (6)
 (12)
 (8)
 (13)
 (2)
 (15)
 (3)
 (1)
 (17)
 (18)
 (2)
 (3)
 (11)
 (10)
 (2)
 (5)
 (1)
 (1)
 (11)
 (1)
 (7)
 (17)
 (2)
 (5)
 (11)
 (20)
 (5)
 (1)
 (1)
 (9)
 (5)
 (9)
 (19)
 (1)
 (9)
 (10)
 (10)
 (13)
 (19)
 (1)
 (8)
 (13)
 (1)
 (12)
 (21)
 (15)
 (5)
 (14)
 (11)
 (18)
 (10)
 (2)
 (1)
 (5)
 (3)

References

 Results

External links

 World Karate Federation
 Official Website

World Championships
World Karate Championships
World Karate Championships
Karate Championships
Karate competitions in France
2012 in Paris
November 2012 sports events in France